The 1999 Arkansas State Indians football team represented Arkansas State University as a member of the Big West Conference the 1999 NCAA Division I-A football season. Led by third-year head coach Joe Hollis, the Indians compiled an overall record of 4–7 with a mark of 2–3 in conference play, placing fifth in the Big West.

Schedule

References

Arkansas State
Arkansas State Red Wolves football seasons
Arkansas State Indians football